Oleg Ivanovich Belov (born April 20, 1973) is a Russian former ice hockey winger.

Career
He was drafted by the Pittsburgh Penguins in the 4th round (102nd overall) in the 1995 NHL Entry Draft. Prior to being drafted by the Penguins, Belov was a member of the Russian Penguins, a touring Russian team that competed in exhibition games against other International Hockey League teams.

Belov has spent the majority of his career playing for HV71 of the Swedish Elitserien and Sibir Novosibirsk of the then-Russian Super League, where he was captain for two seasons (2005–07).

Belov most recently played for Metallurg Novokuznetsk during the 2009-10 KHL season.

Career statistics

Regular season and playoffs

International

References

External links
 

1973 births
Bolzano HC players
Cleveland Lumberjacks players
ECH Chur players
Amur Khabarovsk players
HC CSKA Moscow players
Metallurg Magnitogorsk players
Metallurg Novokuznetsk players
HC Sibir Novosibirsk players
HV71 players
Long Beach Ice Dogs (IHL) players
SC Rapperswil-Jona Lakers players
Living people
Ice hockey people from Moscow
Pittsburgh Penguins draft picks
Russian Penguins players
Russian ice hockey right wingers